Bowman Hotel in Nogales, Arizona was built in 1917.  It was listed on the National Register of Historic Places in 1985.

It was then the oldest hotel building surviving in Nogales.  It was deemed significant in its use of fired (glazed) brick in its facade, being one of only two buildings in Nogales with that.  It is associated with Wirt G. Bowman (1874–1949, a businessman and a state and national politician.

References

Nogales, Arizona
Buildings and structures in Santa Cruz County, Arizona
Hotels established in 1917
Hotel buildings completed in 1917
Hotel buildings on the National Register of Historic Places in Arizona
National Register of Historic Places in Santa Cruz County, Arizona